Robert Michael Slayton (born May 25, 1955) is an American actor and stand-up comedian. Slayton is probably best known for a supporting role in the 2001 film Bandits, and as a frequent guest on The Adam Carolla Show (2006-2009).

Career
Slayton is known for his intense style of stand-up comedy. He adopts a mixed style of complaining, insulting, personal story-telling, not entirely unlike Sam Kinison.

He has been featured on many popular radio shows across the country including Howard Stern, Kevin and Bean, Tom Leykis, and Dave, Shelly, and Chainsaw. He played Joey Bishop in the 1998 movie The Rat Pack and a character named simply "Slayton" in The Mind of the Married Man. He also appeared as himself on the IFC television show "Maron" in 2013. Slayton also played a TV comedian in Tim Burton's film Ed Wood, and as a casino manager, asking "Chili Palmer", John Travolta, for help locating a late paying casino player, in Get Shorty.

Slayton has a distinctive gravelly voice. He performed voiceovers on animated shows like Family Guy and Dr. Katz, Professional Therapist.

He has appeared on many television shows including The Tonight Show, Politically Incorrect, as well as Comic Relief and his own stand-up special on HBO.

Personal life
Slayton was raised in a Jewish home and often jokes about his own Jewish ethnicity. He lives in Los Angeles and has one daughter, singer Natasha Slayton, from the girl group G.R.L.

In 1988, Slayton married Teddie Lee Tillett. Tillett died in March 2016. In June 2017, Slayton and his daughter sued the Sherman Oaks Hospital for wrongful death, claiming the doctors did not properly diagnose her pneumonia. In November 2017, the two sides settled.

Discography
 Raging Bully - CD, 1998
 I've Come For Your Children - CD, 2003
 Built For Destruction - CD, 2006
 Born To Be Bobby -  DVD, 2010

References

External links

1955 births
Living people
American male film actors
American stand-up comedians
Jewish American male actors
Male actors from New York (state)
People from Scarsdale, New York
Comedians from New York (state)
Jewish American comedians
American male comedians
20th-century American comedians
21st-century American comedians
21st-century American Jews